General elections were held in Denmark on 13 November 2007. The elections allowed prime minister Anders Fogh Rasmussen to continue for a third term in a coalition government consisting of Venstre and the Conservative People's Party with parliamentary support from the Danish People's Party. They were the first elections held using the current constituencies.

Contesting parties

Coalitions
According to the Constitution of Denmark, Denmark is governed according to the principle of negative parliamentarism, meaning that while a government doesn't need the majority of seats in parliament, it must never have a majority of seats against it in a vote of no confidence. Before the ongoing elections, this was relevant since the government, consisting of the Conservative People's Party and the Liberals did not have a majority of seats, but depended on the support of the Danish People's Party. Early opinion polls showed that neither a right-wing or a left-wing government could gather enough seats to be in government without the support of the newly established New Alliance. This caused a lot of interest, since New Alliance had stated that they would first give the government the opportunity to propose a programme for government, but that they would not definitely support a right-wing government prior to seeing how many of their political agendas they could work together on. Many people were unsure how this would be possible, since New Alliance was originally formed to limit the influence of the Danish People's Party, without whom a right-wing government did not seem possible in opinion polls. After the elections, however, it was clear that New Alliance did not get enough seats in parliament to break the previous right-wing majority.

The opposition
Shortly after the elections were called, the Social Liberal Party stated that they supported a government led by the Social Democrats. The Red-Green Alliance support a left-wing government almost by default. The Socialist People's Party also support a left-wing government, and have stated that they wish to not only support such a government but to be a part of it. In spite of a dramatic increase in support of the Socialist People's Party in opinion polls, these four parties never stood to get enough seats in parliament to head a government. Consequently, prior to the election, Helle Thorning-Schmidt (the leader of the Social Democrats) invited both New Alliance and the Conservative People's Party to participate in a centre-left government, but both parties refused.

Early election
Danish prime minister Anders Fogh Rasmussen announced this election date on 24 October 2007. The election was held ahead of time in the sense that by law, the election needed to be held before 8 February 2009, four years after the previous election.

Anders Fogh Rasmussen explained that the elections were called early to allow the parliament to work on important upcoming topics without being distracted by a future election. Referring specifically to welfare reform, he said rival parties would then try to outdo each other with expensive reforms which would damage the Danish economy.

Parties that had previously declared their intention to run
The Centre Democrats lacked about 2,000 - 3,000 of the required 20,000 signatures in order to run in the 2007 election when Anders Fogh Rasmussen called it on 24 October, meaning that they won't be able to run. The Liberalists had reached 5,000 signatures. The Danish Ministry of Welfare has registered more than 70 parties that had not handed in the required number of signatures.

Campaign
Several topics have been mentioned as central to the election. These include welfare, taxes, immigration, and the health system. The election also clears the Rasmussen government from having a potentially unpopular parliamentary debate on the European Union Treaty of Lisbon, as it will become a topic in the election instead.

Results

The Socialist People's Party had the election's largest gain, securing 23 seats in the new parliament compared to 11 in the 2005 elections. The Danish People's Party gained one additional seat, leaving it at 25. The New Alliance secured five seats in its first election, a result lower than projected in earlier opinion polls.

The biggest setback was suffered by the Danish Social Liberal Party which was reduced from 17 seats to 9. The Liberals lost six seats leaving it at 46, and the party remains the biggest party for the third consecutive election. The Social Democrats lost two seats, leaving it at 45. The Red-Green Alliance lost two seats leaving it at four seats, just above the 2% threshold.

The Conservative People's Party ensured marginal gains, but no additional seats, leaving it at 18 seats. The Christian Democrats did not ensure representation.

Greenland's vote resulted in one seat for Siumut and one for Inuit Ataqatigiit. The Faroe Islands returned Høgni Hoydal representing the Republican Party, its second seat went to the Union Party, a seat gained from the People's Party which did not achieve representation.

Aftermath
The ruling Liberal-Conservative coalition secured 64 seats. The support of the Danish People's Party (DPP), with 25 seats, left the coalition needing one more seat. Finally, the coalition-friendly Union Party of former Faroese prime minister Edmund Joensen won the needed seat in the Faroese elections.

Parties backing Helle Thorning-Schmidt, in opposition, won 84 seats. (This includes the remaining three seats of the overseas territories.)

The New Alliance won the remaining five seats.

Prime Minister Anders Fogh Rasmussen announced that the party composition of the cabinet would remain as before, but that parties not in a cabinet that support his premiership will have influence over policy. This statement was aimed at the New Alliance. Rasmussen's capacity to accommodate both the New Alliance and the Danish People's Party going forward is not assured – the New Alliance was established, in part, to limit the Danish Peoples' Party's influence. With the DPP in the coalition, Rasmussen can govern: a New Alliance-supported opposition would be short of a majority by one vote. Edmund Joensen's pledge to abstain on matters related to internal affairs of Denmark would alter this, giving the New Alliance the balance of power and risking conflict with the DPP, but Joensen has also pledged that if doing so would risk giving the opposition a majority, he would not abstain, but instead vote with the government.

After the last election, where Rasmussen also secured continuing power, there was some shuffling of minister posts in the cabinet. The resulting Cabinet of Anders Fogh Rasmussen III was presented a few days after the election.

See also
List of members of the Folketing, 2007–2011

References

External links
NSD: European Election Database - Denmark publishes regional level election data; allows for comparisons of election results, 1990-2007

Elections in Denmark
Parliamentary
Denmark
November 2007 events in Europe